Pseudepimolis marpessa is a moth of the family Erebidae. It was described by Herbert Druce in 1906. It is found in Peru.

References

Phaegopterina
Moths described in 1906